Pterolophia quadrigibbosa is a species of beetle in the family Cerambycidae. It was described by Maurice Pic in 1926. It is known from China.

References

quadrigibbosa
Beetles described in 1926